The Second Günther cabinet is the current state government of Schleswig-Holstein, sworn in on 29 June 2022 after Daniel Günther was elected as Minister-President of Schleswig-Holstein by the members of the Landtag of Schleswig-Holstein. It is the 27th Cabinet of Schleswig-Holstein.

It was formed after the 2022 Schleswig-Holstein state election by the Christian Democratic Union (CDU) and Alliance 90/The Greens (GRÜNE). Excluding the Minister-President, the cabinet comprises nine ministers. Five are members of the CDU, three are members of the Greens, and one is an independent politician nominated by the CDU.

Formation 

The previous cabinet was a coalition government of the CDU, Greens, and Free Democratic Party (FDP) led by Minister-President Daniel Günther.

The election took place on 8 May 2022 and resulted in major increase in support for both the CDU and Greens, and a decline for the FDP. The opposition Social Democratic Party (SPD) also suffered major losses, while the South Schleswig Voters' Association (SSW) improved its performance and the AfD lost representation in the Landtag.

Overall, the incumbent coalition was returned with an increased majority; the CDU alone fell just one seat short of an absolute majority and could form a coalition with any one of the other parties. Minister-President Günther initially expressed his desire to renew the outgoing coalition, but both the Greens and FDP ruled this out on the basis that neither wished to join a government in which they were not mathematically needed. After holding separate talks with both parties, the CDU extended an invitation to the Greens for coalition talks on 23 May, which was accepted.

On 22 June, the CDU and Greens announced that they had finalised a coalition agreement. The contract was approved overwhelmingly by both parties' congresses on 27 June, with the Greens recording four dissenting votes and the CDU none.

Daniel Günther was re-elected as Minister-President by the Landtag on 29 June, winning 47 votes out of 66 cast, including four abstentions.

Composition

External links

References 

Politics of Schleswig-Holstein
Government of Schleswig-Holstein
Cabinets of Schleswig-Holstein
State governments of Germany
Cabinets established in 2022
2022 establishments in Germany
Günther